In English football, the Potteries derby is the local derby between the two major clubs in the city of Stoke-on-Trent – Port Vale and Stoke City, first contested in 1882. The fans of each club both consider the other to be their main rivals; this has led to a heated atmosphere at these matches. The two teams have met a total of 185 times, consisting of: 44 English Football League, 6 FA Cup, 62 friendlies, and 73 other (mostly local) cup games. One study in 2019 ranked it as the joint-28th biggest rivalry in English professional football, level with the Manchester derby.

Stoke-on-Trent is the least populous city to have two Football League clubs.  Leeds, Leicester, Coventry, Hull, Bradford, and Cardiff are all larger cities that contain just one league club.

Background
Both clubs come from Stoke-on-Trent and are the only clubs from the city to have played in the English Football League. Port Vale are Burslem based and Stoke City traditionally are based in Stoke-upon-Trent. The city of Stoke-on-Trent was incorporated in 1910 (city status granted in 1925), therefore before this time the two clubs were based in separate towns and were local rivals rather than rivals within the same city. Despite this however, the "Valiants" did use The Old Recreation Ground as their home stadium, which was located in Hanley.

Both clubs had strong links to the local pottery industry, Port Vale's unique name being based on the Trent and Mersey Canal and with City's nickname being The Potters.

Port Vale's support tends to be from the North of the city, notably Tunstall and Burslem. Stoke therefore tend to enjoy greater support in the remaining parts of the city.

History
The two clubs have long league histories, Stoke City were founded in 1863  and Port Vale were probably formed in 1876. In the early 20th century, both clubs spent time out of the Football League structure: from 1907 (for Vale) and 1908 (for Stoke) until 1919 – both had resigned due to financial troubles. Stoke were founder members of the football league in 1888 and Port Vale were founder members of both the Second Division in 1892 and the Fourth Division in 1958. City have tended to be the more successful club over the years, the most valued trophy going to Stoke in 1972 in the form of the League Cup. Although Vale did reach the semi-finals of the FA Cup in 1954, Stoke bettered this with a second-place finish in 2011. Stoke have also tended to play in higher tiers of the football league throughout the clubs' history, although since 1919 the two clubs have found themselves in the same league for 22 seasons. Vale have had only five seasons playing at a higher level than City, and never in the top flight. Whilst competing in the same division, Vale have finished above Stoke on seven occasions. In every other year of the two clubs' Football League history Stoke have therefore have finished above Vale.

The first derby game was played at Westport Meadows on 2 December 1882, in the Second Round of the Staffordshire Senior Cup. Vale were complete unknowns, and so pulled off a surprise by managing a 1–1 with their more established rivals-to-be. No details of the match were recorded, though The Staffordshire Sentinel did mention the match along with the comment that it was "a spirited game". Stoke won the replay 5–1 at the Victoria Ground seven days later, with George Shutt bagging four of the goals. It took Vale seventeen attempts to register their first victory over Stoke, which they finally did in a friendly on 29 March 1890, winning 2–1.

The biggest attendance came on 6 January 1951, as a crowd of 49,500 packed into the Victoria Ground to witness the teams draw in an FA Cup First Round encounter. Three years later some 46,777 turned up at the ground when the pair met in the league. The biggest crowd for an encounter at Vale Park came on 25 April 1955, when a crowd of 41,674 witnessed a Stoke victory.

Though the two clubs have been main rivals since as early as the 1880s, they have supported each other in times of need. Before regaining their Football League status in the early 20th century, the two clubs had a pact that meant Vale would not bid for membership, leaving Stoke more likely to succeed in their bid; Stoke would then support Vale in any future bids they made. During times of deep financial crisis at the Vale, Stoke played fund-raising matches with the Vale in order to try and prevent their rivals from going into liquidation. In turn, Vale allowed Stoke to play a home game at Vale Park when a freak gale in January 1976 caused severe damage to the Victoria Ground.

Stoke's ten-year run in the Premier League (2008–09 to 2017–18) under the ownership of billionaire Peter Coates coincided with Vale spending five seasons in League Two, leaving the two clubs three divisions apart. However Stoke's relegation to and subsequent struggles in the Championship led to realistic prospects of a future renewing of hostilities. On 4 December 2018, Stoke's under-21s lost 4–0 to Vale's first-team in the EFL Trophy at Vale Park, and after the match an estimated "minority of 150-200 people" within Stoke's 4,000 ticket allocation trashed the away end at Vale Park; this added a sour note to Vale's season high attendance record of 7,940. Vale launched a controversial new commercial campaign in October 2019, offering youngsters the chance to swap Stoke City shirts and tickets for Vale ones, which was a response to Stoke's popular 'City 7s' scheme which handed seven year olds a shirt and match tickets for a game at the Bet365 Stadium.

Game list
The most recent game resulted in a 1–0 away win for Port Vale, Stoke City's last win over Vale being seven derbies ago.

This list shows all competitive senior matches in the English Football League, the FA Cup, League Cup, and League Trophy. Matches from wartime competitions, friendlies, Staffordshire Senior Cup, and other minor cup competitions are not included.

Note that the league system was re-organized in 1992 with the creation of the Premier League and in 2004 with the league re-branding.

Statistics

Honours

These are the major footballing honours of Port Vale and Stoke City.

Crossing the divide

Players who have played for both clubs

The player with the most appearances in derby games is Tom Holford, who played nine times in Stoke colours and nineteen times in Vale colours between 1899 and 1922. Dickie Smith played 24 appearances in Stoke colours, whilst Billy Briscoe turned out 22 times for the "Valiants". The player with most appearances in the derby following World War II is John McCue, who played seventeen times for the "Potters", followed by Vale's Roy Sproson with fifteen derby appearances. In terms of goals scored the record-holder is Bob Whittingham, who knocked thirteen goals in for Stoke between 1917 and 1920, though only one of these came in a Football League encounter. The most successful scorer in Vale colours has been Wilf Kirkham with seven goals, though he also scored once whilst playing on Stoke's side – all Kirkham's goals came in the English Football League.

Players in bold transferred directly between the clubs, or were released by one and then signed for the other. Only players who made a competitive first-team appearance are included on the list.  Will Forrester and Liam McCarron moved from Stoke to Vale in the summer of 2022, the former permanently and the latter on loan, in what was described as a "new era" in relations between the two clubs. Prior to McCarron, John Lumsdon was the last player to have joined Port Vale on loan from Stoke City, having made the move in March 1978. Both the Potteries clubs also share a rivalry with Crewe Alexandra. Players highlighted in purple have turned out for all three clubs.

Managers who worked at both clubs
Those in bold were actually full-time managers at both clubs.

References

External links
Head-to-head stats at Soccerbase
Profile on footballderbies.com

England football derbies
Port Vale F.C.
Sport in Stoke-on-Trent
Stoke City F.C.